John Horne FLS (1835–1905) was a Scottish botanist. He served as director of the Botanic Gardens of Pamplemousses, Mauritius.

The Sapindaceae genus Hornea is named after Horne.

Life
Horne was born in Lethendy, Perthshire, Scotland. He worked at Kew in 1859–1860 and at the Botanic Gardens Mauritius 1861–1891, serving as Director from 1877 onward.

He collected plants in Mauritius and the Seychelles.

On his transfer to Fiji, Arthur Gordon hand-picked a retinue of officials to accompany him, including Horne, who moved to Fiji a year after Gordon, in 1876.

Horne died in Jersey in the Channel Islands on 16 April 1905.

References

External links
Dictionary of British and Irish Botanists and Horticulturists

Scottish botanists
1835 births
1905 deaths
People from Perth and Kinross
Plant collectors
19th-century Scottish people
Fellows of the Linnean Society of London
19th-century British botanists